Johnson Township is an inactive township in Washington County, in the U.S. state of Missouri.

Johnson Township was erected in 1852, and most likely was named after a pioneer citizen.

References

Townships in Missouri
Townships in Washington County, Missouri
1852 establishments in Missouri